The 1984 United States presidential election in Alabama took place on November 6, 1984. All 50 states and the District of Columbia were part of the 1984 United States presidential election. Alabama voters chose 9 electors to the Electoral College, which selected the president and vice president of the United States.

Alabama was won by incumbent United States President Ronald Reagan of California, who was running against former Vice President Walter Mondale of Minnesota. Reagan ran for a second time with former C.I.A. Director George H. W. Bush of Texas, and Mondale ran with Representative Geraldine Ferraro of New York, the first major female candidate for the vice presidency.

The presidential election of 1984 was a very partisan election for Alabama, with just under 99 percent of the electorate voting only either Democratic or Republican. Every county in the state gave either Reagan or Mondale a majority save Etowah County, which gave Reagan a plurality. Macon County gave Mondale 82.71% of the vote, which was the highest percentage he received in any county nationwide outside the District of Columbia. Reagan's best county was Shelby, which gave him 77.88%.

Reagan easily carried Alabama on Election Day, winning the state by a 22-point margin, a dramatic shift from 1980, when Reagan had won it by just 1.3% over Southerner Jimmy Carter. This was only the third time that the Republican nominee exceeded 60% of the vote in the Yellowhammer State, after Barry Goldwater in 1964 and Richard Nixon in 1972. Mondale carried most of Alabama's Black Belt counties, but outside these predominantly African-American counties, he carried only Colbert, Lawrence, and Jackson Counties, which lay within the region served by the Tennessee Valley Authority (Colbert is home to Muscle Shoals). Overwhelmingly, the state's 'Wallace country' went red this election, unlike in 1976 or even 1980. As an example, Reagan claimed over 2/3 of the vote in Coffee County, which had voted for Carter in 1976 by over 20% and had voted for Reagan in 1980 by just 4.7%.

Alabama voted the same way as its Deep Southern neighbor Mississippi for the 29th time in a row, a trend dating back to 1872. The last time the two states voted differently was (and, as of 2020, remains) 1840, when Mississippi voted for William Henry Harrison, and Alabama, for Martin Van Buren. (In 1868, Mississippi, unlike Alabama, hadn't yet been re-admitted to the Union.)

Results

Results by county

See also
 Presidency of Ronald Reagan
 United States presidential elections in Alabama

References

Alabama
1984
1984 Alabama elections